Marguerite Scheppers was a Dutch painter.

She was a miniaturist and known for her illuminations she performed in a number of nunneries such as in the couvent des sœurs de Notre-Dame and couvent des sœurs de Sion, though she was not herself a nun. She was active from 1501 onward, and regarded for her skill as a miniaturist. She was the teacher of Cornelia van Wulfskerke (died 15 April 1540), a sister of the convent of Sion.

References
 Biographie Nationale Tome 21

People of the Habsburg Netherlands
16th-century Dutch painters
16th-century women artists